Jimmy Vijgen (born 23 August 2000) is a Dutch professional footballer who plays as a winger for Eerste Divisie club MVV.

Career
Vijgen was born in Heerlen, Limburg, and started playing youth football for Groene Ster. After one year, as a seven-year-old, he joined the Roda JC Kerkrade academy. In 2019, he was promoted to Roda JC's under-21 team. He made his professional debut for the first team on 28 March 2021, replacing Dylan Vente in the 89th minute of a 3–1 home win over Cambuur.

On 29 July 2022, Vijgen signed a one-year contract with Eerste Divisie rivals MVV. He made his debut for the club on 9 September, replacing Sven Blummel in the 86th minute of a 5–0 away defeat to FC Eindhoven.

Personal life
In 2021, Vijgen graduated from Arcus College in Heerlen as a sales specialist, an education he chose due to his parents being in the catering industry.

Career statistics

References

External links
 

2000 births
Living people
Sportspeople from Heerlen
Footballers from Limburg (Netherlands)
Dutch footballers
Association football wingers
RKSV Groene Ster players
Roda JC Kerkrade players
MVV Maastricht players
Eerste Divisie players